is a Japanese anime music composer and video game composer.

Discography

Video games
Composition

Bomberman 64 (1997)
3-Nen B-Gumi Kinpachi Sensei: Densetsu no Kyoudan ni Tate!

Anime
Composition

Captain Tsubasa Road to 2002
Fight Ippatsu! Jūden-chan!!
Cyborg 009 The Cyborg Soldier
Dinozaurs: The Series
Final Fantasy: Unlimited
Haré+Guu
Haré+Guu Deluxe
Isekai no Seikishi Monogatari
Jungle Wa Itsumo Hale Nochi Guu Final
The Law of Ueki
Nightwalker
Pikachu's Island Adventure (Short)
Pikachu's PikaBoo
Samurai Gun
Sasami: Magical Girls Club
Sasami: Magical Girls Club Season 2
Seraphim Call
Skip Beat!
Tenchi Muyo! GXP
Tenchi Muyo! Ryo-Ohki OAV 3
Tokyo Underground
Tōka Gettan
Tsuki wa Higashi ni Hi wa Nishi ni: Operation Sanctuary
Yami to Bōshi to Hon no Tabibito
Yoshimune
Tonari no Seki-kun

Title Themes
Ah! My Goddess
Ah! My Goddess: Flights of Fancy
Sakura Wars 2

References

External links
 

1964 births
Anime composers
Japanese composers
Japanese film score composers
Japanese male composers
Japanese male film score composers
Living people
Musicians from Hyōgo Prefecture
Video game composers